Neville Albert Read (15 March 1949 – 21 December 2014) was an Australian Paralympic lawn bowls player.  He won a bronze medal at the 1988 Seoul Games in the Men's Wheelchair Singles 2–6 event. He also competed at the 2002 Commonwealth Games, winning a bronze medal in the Men's Triples Physically Disabled.

References

Paralympic lawn bowls players of Australia
Lawn bowls players at the 1988 Summer Paralympics
Paralympic bronze medalists for Australia
Medalists at the 1988 Summer Paralympics
Australian male bowls players
Commonwealth Games bronze medallists for Australia
Bowls players at the 2002 Commonwealth Games
2014 deaths
1949 births
Commonwealth Games medallists in lawn bowls
Paralympic medalists in lawn bowls
Medallists at the 2002 Commonwealth Games